Beomil station is a railway station of the Donghae Line in Beomcheon-dong, Busanjin District, Busan, South Korea. The station is unrelated to the Beomil station of Busan Metro.

References

External links

Busanjin District
Railway stations in Busan
Railway stations opened in 1943